The Stand-In (十月围城 Shíyuè Wéichéng, "October Siege") is a 2014 Chinese TV series, a spin-off following the success of the 2009 film Bodyguards and Assassins (also 十月围城 Shíyuè Wéichéng in Chinese). The series is directed by Ju Jueliang (:zh:鞠觉亮).

Cast
Wallace Chung 鍾漢良
Liu Xiaoxiao 劉小小
Wu Gang 吳剛
Ng Man-Tat 吳孟達
Zhang Xiaolong 張曉龍
Wang Zizi
Yan Minqiu
He Jiayi
Hu Dong
Zhang Haoxiang
Lu Jiyi
Bobo Gan
Han Dong
Jing Gangshan
Liu Yidan

Awards and nominations

International broadcast

References

2014 Chinese television series debuts
Chinese action television series
Martial arts television series